Stocking Lake may refer to:

Stocking Lake (Hubbard County, Minnesota)
Stocking Lake (Wadena County, Minnesota)